The 1966 NCAA Men's University Division Ice Hockey Tournament was the culmination of the 1965–66 NCAA University Division men's ice hockey season, the 19th such tournament in NCAA history. It was held between March 17 and 19, 1966, and concluded with Michigan State defeating Clarkson 6–1. All games were played at the Williams Arena in Minneapolis, Minnesota.

Qualifying teams
Four teams qualified for the tournament, two each from the eastern and western regions. The ECAC tournament champion and the two WCHA tournament co-champions received automatic bids into the tournament. An at-large bid was offered to a second eastern team based upon both their ECAC tournament finish as well as their regular season record.

Format
Despite winning the tournament the ECAC champion was not seeded as the top eastern team; this occurred because the at-large team played and won more games, both in conference and overall. The WCHA co-champion with the better regular season record was given the top western seed. The second eastern seed was slotted to play the top western seed and vice versa. All games were played at the Williams Arena. All matches were Single-game eliminations with the semifinal winners advancing to the national championship game and the losers playing in a consolation game.

Bracket

Note: * denotes overtime period(s)

Semifinals

(W1) Denver vs. (E2) Clarkson

(E1) Boston University vs. (W2) Michigan State

Consolation Game

(W1) Denver vs. (E1) Boston University

National Championship

(E2) Clarkson vs. (W2) Michigan State

All-Tournament team

First Team
 G: Gaye Cooley* (Michigan State)
 D: Don Heaphy (Michigan State)
 D: Wayne Smith (Denver)
 F: Mike Coppo (Michigan State)
 F: Tom Hurley (Clarkson)
 F: Brian McAndrew (Michigan State)
* Most Outstanding Player(s)

Second Team
 G: Terry Yurkiewicz (Clarkson)
 D: Pete McLachlan (Boston University)
 D: Bob Brawley (Michigan State)
 F: Tom Mikkola (Michigan State)
 F: John McLennan (Clarkson)
 F: Lyle Bradley (Denver)

References

 
 
 
 

Tournament
NCAA Division I men's ice hockey tournament
NCAA University Division Men's Ice Hockey Tournament
NCAA University Division Men's Ice Hockey Tournament
1960s in Minneapolis
Ice hockey competitions in Minneapolis